Pike County Airport , also known as Hatcher Field, is a public-use airport in Pike County, Kentucky, United States. It is owned by the Pike County Regional Airport Board and located six nautical miles (11 km) northwest of the central business district of Pikeville, Kentucky. This airport is included in the FAA's National Plan of Integrated Airport Systems for 2009–2013, which categorized it as a general aviation facility.

From October 24, 2014 to July 24, 2015 Pike County Airport had nonstop scheduled airline service called Appalachian Air to Nashville International Airport. The service was operated by Corporate Flight Management on Jetstream 31 aircraft.

Facilities and aircraft
It has two asphalt paved runways: 9/27 is 5,350 by 100 feet (1,631 x 30 m) and 2/20 is 3,600 by 75 feet (1,097 x 23 m). Only runway 9/27 is open for aircraft operations; runway 2/20 is closed indefinitely.

For the 12-month period ending September 30, 2009, the airport had 8,722 aircraft operations, an average of 23 per day: 87% general aviation, 11% air taxi, and 2% military. At that time there were 23 aircraft based at this airport: 83% single-engine and 17% multi-engine.

References

External links
 Pike County Airport, official site
 Aerial image as of 15 March 1995 from USGS The National Map
 
 

Airports in Kentucky
Buildings and structures in Pike County, Kentucky
Transportation in Pike County, Kentucky